

The Shikumen Open House Museum (Shanghainese: Olishian-Sakumen Bovahgue) is a museum in the Xintiandi area of Shanghai, China (administratively in the Huangpu District) that presents a house in the traditional shikumen style.

This is a small museum on the south side of the North Block of Xintiandi on Xingye Road that presents Shanghai life as it was around the 1920s and 30s in a shikumen-style "stone-gate" house. There are about five rooms furnished with period furniture. The museum includes a tingzijian, a small triangular room, sometimes rented out at a low price to impoverished writers and others.

Transport
The nearest Shanghai Metro stations are South Huangpi Road Station on Line 1 to the north and Xintiandi on Line 10 to the south.

See also

 Museum of the First National Congress of the Chinese Communist Party in the same road

References

External links

 The Shikumen Open House Museum

Museums with year of establishment missing
Houses in Shanghai
Museums in Shanghai
Historic house museums in China